Guillermo A. Somoza Colombani, born in Guaynabo, Puerto Rico, is an attorney and the former Secretary of Justice of Puerto Rico. He holds a BA in Physiology from the University of Puerto Rico and obtained a JD from the Interamerican University of Puerto Rico School of Law. Somoza was appointed by Governor Luis Fortuño after the resignation of Antonio Sagardía and confirmed by the Puerto Rico Senate in May, 2010.

Somoza was appointed in 1997 by then-Governor Pedro Rosselló as a Minors Advocate, a post he held until promoted by Sagardía as head of the Minors and Family Advocates Division of the Puerto Rico Department of Justice.

In August 2018, Somoza was stopped by police for speeding in a Porsche while accompanied by his 17-year old son. He was charged with negligence but the final resolution was to pay a $300 fine.

References

Living people
Interamerican University of Puerto Rico alumni
Members of the 15th Cabinet of Puerto Rico
People from Guaynabo, Puerto Rico
Puerto Rican lawyers
Secretaries of Justice of Puerto Rico
University of Puerto Rico alumni
Year of birth missing (living people)